Like Shadows is the second studio album by the American screamo band Ampere. The album was released on June 21, 2011, through No Idea Records. Like Shadows followed a string of split EPs and singles and is Ampere's first full-length album in six years. The album was available to stream online through The A.V. Club in June 2011, and the album was released to positive critical reception. Many reviewers praised the conciseness, the creativity, and variety of sounds on the album, although some criticism was aimed at the album's short length, clocking in at just over 13 minutes.

Track listing

References

2011 albums
Ampere (band) albums
No Idea Records albums